Watson Kirkconnell,  (16 May 1895 – 26 February 1977) was a Canadian scholar, university administrator, poet, and translator. Kirkconnell was also a nationally influential public intellectual who publicized and denounced human rights abuses under Fascism, Nazism, and Stalinism.

For his many many translations of their national poetry, Kirkconnell remains very well known in Iceland, Eastern and Central Europe. He collaborated with distinguished literary scholars and academics of his time in both selecting and perfecting his translations, such as Douglas Hyde and Pavle Popović. One of his most popular translations is of János Arany's The Bards of Wales, a ballad covertly denouncing the defeat of the Hungarian revolution of 1848. 

Beginning during the interwar period, Kirkconnell also sought to return John Milton to his pedestal by translating and publishing what had long been believed to been Milton's many sources of inspiration from Christian poetry in other languages.

Kirkconnell is particularly famous for his translations of the work of White ethnic immigrant poets and their descendants, whom he sometimes termed, "New Canadians", from languages such as Icelandic, Ukrainian, and Canadian Gaelic. Among Canadians of White ethnic ancestry, Kirkconnell is remembered with even more gratitude for his successful advocacy for their social acceptance in what was still an overwhelmingly Anglophile country. For this reason, Kirkconnell has often been called the father of multiculturalism in Canada.

Family background
Watson Kirkconnell's paternal ancestors derived their surname from the village and ruined monastery of Kirkconnel. They were Presbyterians, spoke Galwegian Gaelic, wore the Clan Douglas tartan, and farmed near Kirkcudbright, in Dumfries and Galloway. Due to what Kirkconnell later dubbed, "the almost universal holocaust of Scottish archives during the Reformation", his genealogy could not be traced with complete accuracy or linked, as he strongly suspected was the case, to a cadet branch of the Clan Douglas or Clan Maxwell lairds of Kirkconnel. In, "an almost imperceptible little ripple in the vast tide of Scottish immigration that flowed into Canada", Walter Kirkconnell (1795-1860), the poet's great-grandfather, sailed for the New World in 1819 and settled as a pioneer in Chatham Township, Argenteuil County, Quebec. As a result of a 1953 search made at Kirkconnell's request by the Scottish Council, it was proven that everyone named Kirkconnell had joined the Scottish diaspora and that none with the same surname still lived in Scotland.

At the time, Chatham Township was largely being settled by Gaelic-speaking immigrants from Perthshire. Walter Kirkconnell accordingly married one of them; Mary McCallum, the daughter of John and Janet (née McDiarmid) McCallum, from the farmhouse known as "Carnban" in what is now a now ruined and completely depopulated village in Glen Lyon. Reformed worship in Chatham Township continued the 16th-century practice of exclusive and unaccompanied Gaelic psalm singing in a form known as precenting the line. In her old age, Mary McCallum Kirkconnell, despite having gone blind, could still sing all 154 Scottish Gaelic Metrical Psalms from memory.

Kirkconnell's maternal great-grandfather, Christopher Watson, emigrated from Alston, Cumberland to Upper Canada in 1819 and became a schoolmaster in York, later renamed Toronto. Christopher's youngest son, Thomas Watson, had adopted his father's profession and taught at the schools in Allanburg, Beachwood, Lundy's Lane, Stamford, and Port Hope, Ontario. In 1851, Thomas Watson had married Margaret Elma Green of Lundy's Lane, a woman descended from Welsh-American United Empire Loyalists, as well as more recent British immigrants to Canada with both German and Spanish roots.

Kirkconnell's parents, Thomas Kirkconnell (1862-1934) and Bertha (née Watson) Kirkconnell (1867-1957), were living in Port Hope, Ontario, where Thomas Kirkconnell was the headmaster of the high school, when their earliest children were born.

Life
After World War II and during the beginning of the Cold War, Kirkconnell wrote a poem defending Draža Mihailović, harshly denouncing the Serbian Chetnik General's show trial by Josip Broz Tito's Soviet-backed Yugoslav Partisans, and eulogizing the General's execution by firing squad on July 17, 1946. Kirkconnell wrote the poem because he believed that General Mihailović was innocent of both Chetnik war crimes in World War II and of collaboration with the occupying Axis forces and that his "trial" was nothing more or less than a Stalinist witch hunt.

From 1948 to 1964, Kirkconnell was the ninth President of Acadia University.

In 1968, he was made an Officer of the Order of Canada "for his services at home and abroad as an educator, scholar and writer". In 1936, he was made a Fellow of the Royal Society of Canada.

References

External links
 János Arany: Bards of Wales - translated by Watson Kirkconnell
 They’ve Walled up Every Window ... - One of Tibor Tollas's poems in English, translated by Watson Kirkconnell
 
 
 
 
 
 Archives of Watson Kirkconnell (Watson Kirkconnell fonds, R1847) are held at Library and Archives Canada. Fonds consists of three drafts of the translation from Ukrainian of The Poetical Works of Taras Shevchenko.

1895 births
1977 deaths
20th-century Canadian translators
20th-century Baptists
Canadian anti-communists
Canadian anti-fascists
Canadian Baptists
Canadian people of Scottish descent
Canadian university and college chief executives
Fellows of the Royal Society of Canada
Formalist poets
Hungarian–English translators
Officers of the Order of Canada
Translators from Old East Slavic
Translators of The Tale of Igor's Campaign
Translators from Russian
Ukrainian–English translators